Knutsen Lake is a lake in Waseca County, in the U.S. state of Minnesota.

Knutsen Lake was named for Gullick Knutsen, a Norwegian settler who served as a county clerk.

References

Lakes of Minnesota
Lakes of Waseca County, Minnesota